Patsy Klengenberg Island is an uninhabited island within the Arctic Archipelago in the Kitikmeot Region, Nunavut. It is located in Bathurst Inlet. Other islands in the vicinity include Lewes Island, Marcet Island, and Walrus Island.

It is named after Patsy Klengenberg, son of trader Christian Klengenberg, and interpreter to Diamond Jenness during the Canadian Arctic Expedition of 1913-1916.

References

External links
Patsy Klengenberg Diary Transcript and Letter at Dartmouth College Library

Islands of Bathurst Inlet
Uninhabited islands of Kitikmeot Region